The 61st "Stepova" Jager Infantry (Forest and Swampland Light Mechanized) Brigade is one of the youngest formations of the Mechanized Infantry of the Ukrainian Ground Forces, raised in 2015 as the 61st Motorized Infantry Brigade (61-ша окрема мотопіхотна бригада) of the Ukrainian Ground Forces' 4th Army Reserve Corps. Based in Zhytomyr Oblast, it is one of the Ground Forces' specialized formations, whose role is to defend the forest lands of the north as well as the swampy terrain of the Pinsk Marshes, which are in the area of responsibility (AOR) of the brigade.

Brief history 
The brigade, one of the youngest formations to be established in the Ground Forces as a result of the expansion of this service in light of the War in Donbass, was raised in 2015 first as a reserve motorized formation of the Ground Forces Command, which would later be transferred in 2017-18 as part of the 4th Army Reserve Corps, with its first brigade HQ and garrison based in Chernihiv, Chernihiv Oblast. At first, the brigade was a motorized infantry unit with its own artillery regiment and 3 battalions, each former territorial defense battalions.

On 25 April 2019, the formation, in compliance with a directive from the Ministry of Defense and the Armed Forces General Headquarters, left the reserves and was placed with its new designation as a light infantry unit under the Operational Command North in Zhytomyr, Zhytomyr Oblast. The majority of the servicemen of the brigade are personnel under contract service within the Ground Forces, many of them coming from the territory of the oblast and from the forested sectors within the brigade's AOR. They are thus equipped for forest and swamp warfare operations within its vicinity, especially in the Belarusian and Russian borders and in the swamplands of Pripyat in the north, working with personnel of the Chief Directorate of Intelligence of the Ministry of Defence of Ukraine and the Special Operations Forces, as well as the State Border Service. It is the terrain of the AOR of this brigade, which cannot be traversed by mechanized vehicles, that makes the brigade's duties all the more important in this part of Ukraine. Since parts of the AOR have had been covered by the Chernobyl excursion zone the brigade is planned to be also embarked in a specialized CBRN defense capability in the coming years.

The Jager (Ukrainian: єгерська) designation of the brigade, the first Ukrainian unit to bear this title after more than a century, is of German origin in the same-named light infantry formations of the German Army, the defunct Austro-Hungarian Army and in the former Imperial Russian Army, which stationed such units in the past in the Kyiv and Odessa Military Districts. 

In 2022, the infantry brigade was mechanized from being a light motorized unit.

Brigade organization as of 2022 
 61st Jager Infantry Brigade, Zhytomyr
 Headquarters & Headquarters Company, Zhytomyr
 1st Rifle Battalion (Mech)
 2nd Rifle Battalion (Mech)
 3rd Rifle Battalion (Mech)
 Tank Battalion
 61st Brigade Artillery Group (Light)
 Headquarters & Target Acquisition Battery
 Self-propelled Artillery Battalion (2S1 Gvozdika)
 Field Howitzer Artillery Battalion 
 Rocket Artillery Battalion (BM-21 Grad)
 Anti-tank Artillery Battalion (MT-12 Rapira)
 61st Brigade Air Defense Missile Artillery Battalion (Light)
 Engineer Battalion
 Maintenance Battalion
 Logistic Battalion
 Reconnaissance Company
 Sniper Company
 Electronic Warfare Company
 Signal Company
 Radar Company
 CBRN-defense Company
 Medical Company
 Brigade Band

References

See also

Brigades of the Ukrainian Ground Forces
Military units and formations established in 2015